This is a list of people who have served as Custos Rotulorum of Devon.

 Sir Thomas Denys 1507–1553
 Sir Peter Carew bef. 1558–1575
 Sir Gawain Carew bef. 1577 – bef. 1584
 Sir John Gilbert bef. 1584–1596
 Edward Russell, 3rd Earl of Bedford 1596–1619
 Sir Robert Chichester (died 1627), per inscription on his monument in Pilton Church, dates not stated
 Francis Russell, 4th Earl of Bedford 1619–1641
 William Russell, 5th Earl of Bedford 1641–1642
 Henry Bourchier, 5th Earl of Bath 1642–1646
Interregnum
George Monck, 1st Duke of Albemarle 1660–1670
John Granville, 1st Earl of Bath 1670–1675
Christopher Monck, 2nd Duke of Albemarle 1675–1688
John Granville, 1st Earl of Bath 1689–1696
Thomas Grey, 2nd Earl of Stamford 1696–1711?
John Poulett, 1st Earl Poulett 1711–1714
For later custodes rotulorum, see Lord Lieutenant of Devon.

References
Institute of Historical Research - Custodes Rotulorum 1544-1646
Institute of Historical Research - Custodes Rotulorum 1660-1828

Devon